Evelyn Hallman Pond, at Evelyn Hallman Park (formerly Canal Park) is a small man-made lake located west of Scottsdale Road and south of McKellips Road in the northern part of Tempe, Arizona. Lying on the east side of the Cross Cut Canal (from where it gets its water) it must be reached from the east.

Park and lake were renamed in 2006 for Evelyn Hallman,  mother of mayor Hugh Hallman.

Fish species
 Rainbow Trout
 Largemouth Bass
 Sunfish
 Catfish (Channel)
 Tilapia
 Carp

References

External links
 Evelyn Hallman Pond
  Evelyn Hallman Park
 Arizona's Salt River Project canal history.

Reservoirs in Arizona
Reservoirs in Maricopa County, Arizona